The Ministry of Education, Science and Technology is a governmental ministry of Kenya, that is in charge of national policies and programs that enable Kenyans gain access to high-quality, low-cost schooling, post-secondary education, higher education, and academic research. The Kenyan Ministry of Education is mandated by the Kenyan Constitution, Chapter Four, Articles 43, 53, 54, 55, 56, 57, and 59, which include provisions on children's right to free and compulsory basic education, including quality services, as well as access to education institutions and facilities for persons with disabilities who are integrated into society, to the extent compatible with the person's interests. 

Its head office is in  Jogoo House B’, Harambee Avenue, Nairobi, Kenya.

The head of the Ministry has been referred to as a Minister in the past, however in 2017 this title changed to Cabinet Secretary, this in line with the 2010 Constitution of Kenya which allows the government to have 22 ministries.

 the director general is Elyas Abdi Jillaow.

Ministers of Education 

 Minister of Education in 1964 - Hon. J.D Otiende.
 Minister of Education in 1964, 1965, 1966 and 1967 - Hon. Mbiyu Koinange.
 Minister of Education in 1967 - Hon Joseph Nyaga.
 Minister of Education in 1968 -1969 - Hon. J.G Kiano.
 Minister of Education in 1973,1974,1976,1977,1978 and 1979 - Hon. Taita Arap Towett.
 Minister of Basic Education in 1975 - Hon. Dr. Zachary Onyonka.
 Minister of Basic Education in 1979 - Hon. Moses Mudavadi.
 Minister of Education in 1980,1981,1982,1983,1984 and 1985 - Hon. Prof Jonathan Ng’eno.
 Minister of Higher Education in 1980,1981,1982 and 1983 - Hon Joseph Kamotho.
 Minister of Education, Science, and Technology in 1986, 1987, 1988, 1989, 1994 and 2001 - Hon. Peter Oloo Aringo.
 Minister of Education and Human resource Development in 1998, 1999, 2000 and 2001 - Hon Kalonzo Musyoka.
 Minister of Education in 1999, 2000, 2001 and 2002 - Hon. Henry Koskey.
 Minister of Education in 2003, 2004, 2005, 2006 and 2007 - Hon. Prof George Saitoti.
 Minister of Education in 2008, 2009, 2010, 2011 and 2012 - Hon. Prof Sam Ongeri.
 Minister of Education in 2012 and 2013 - Hon Mutula Kilonzo.
 Minister of Education in 2013, 2014 and 2015 - Hon Prof Jacob Kaimenyi.
 Minister of Education 2016 and 2017/Cabinet Secretary for education 2016-2017 - Hon Fred Matiang’i.
 Minister of Education in 2018/Cabinet Secretary for education 2018 - Hon Amina Mohammed.
 Minister of Education in 2018/Cabinet Secretary for education 2018 - Prof. George Magoha.

Institutions 

 Primary and Secondary Education Institutions.
 Public Universities and Tertiary Institutions.
 Technical Training Institutes.
 Youth Polytechnics.
 National Polytechnics.

References

External links
 Ministry of Education, Science and Technology
Kenya
Government of Kenya